KWG Group Holdings is one of the largest privately owned property developers in Guangzhou, Guangdong, China. It is engaged in the development of residential, commercial and hotel properties in Guangzhou, Suzhou, Kunshan, Chengdu and Beijing. In particular, KWG is focusing on developments in the Zhujiang New Town, a new central business district in Guangzhou and the venue of Asian Games in 2010.

The company was established in 1995 and listed on the Hong Kong Stock Exchange in 2007.

See also
Real estate in China

References

External links
KWG Property Holdings Limited

Companies listed on the Hong Kong Stock Exchange
Real estate companies established in 1995
Companies based in Guangzhou
Privately held companies of China
Real estate companies of China